The Alsea Bay Bridge is a concrete arch bridge that spans the Alsea Bay on U.S. Route 101 (US 101) near Waldport, Oregon.

History

There have been two bridges on this site.

The first bridge was designed by Conde McCullough and opened in 1936.

The hostile environment caused significant corrosion to the steel reinforcements. In 1972 the Oregon Department of Transportation began projects aimed at extending the life of the bridge.  By the mid-1980s it was decided to replace the bridge rather than continuing costly rehabilitation efforts.  The first bridge was demolished in 1991.
Construction of the second bridge, designed by HNTB, began in 1988, and it was opened in the fall of 1991 at a cost of $42.4 million. The bridge has a latex concrete deck and the piers are significantly thicker than normal in an attempt to thwart corrosion. Its life expectancy is 75 to 100 years.

See also

List of bridges documented by the Historic American Engineering Record in Oregon
List of bridges on U.S. Route 101 in Oregon

References

External links
Photos

Alsea Bay Bridge Interpretive Center

Alsea Bay Bridge Photo Gallery

Through arch bridges in the United States
Bridges completed in 1991
Bridges completed in 1936
U.S. Route 101
Concrete bridges in Oregon
Road bridges in Oregon
Historic American Engineering Record in Oregon
Bridges by Conde McCullough
1936 establishments in Oregon
Bridges of the United States Numbered Highway System
Bridges in Lincoln County, Oregon